Tell Hamis Subdistrict  is a subdistrict of Qamishli District in northeastern al-Hasakah Governorate, northeastern Syria. The administrative centre is the town of Tell Hamis.

At the 2004 census, the subdistrict had a population of 71,699.

Cities, towns and villages

References 

Qamishli District
Tell Hamis